Circle 7 may refer to:

 Circle 7 logo, used by a number of American television stations
 Circle 7 Animation, a division of Walt Disney Feature Animation
 Circle 7 Koran, sacred text of the Moorish Science Temple of America
 The 7th circle of hell in Dante's Inferno